George Bowman Ferry  (1851–1918) was an architect who was a partner in the architectural firm Ferry & Clas.

Biography
George Bowman Ferry was born in Springfield, Massachusetts in 1851. He attended the Massachusetts Institute of Technology in 1871-72. In the mid-1870s he formed the firm of Ferry & Gardner in Springfield. His works as a member of this firm include a now-demolished office building for The Republican, completed in 1878.

Ferry left Springfield for Milwaukee in 1881, and was one of Wisconsin's first academically trained architects. After several years of private practice, in 1890 he formed the firm of Ferry & Clas with Alfred C. Clas. The partnership was dissolved in 1913, and both returned to private practice.

Personal life
Ferry was married to Cora Phillips of Lake Mills, Wisconsin. He died in 1918 at his home in Milwaukee. He is buried in Lake Mills, Wisconsin.  His papers were donated to the Captain Frederick Pabst Mansion by William P. Ferry, George Bowman Ferry's grandson, in 2001.

In 1885 Ferry became a Fellow of the Western Association of Architects, which merged with the American Institute of Architects in 1889. Ferry remained a member and Fellow of the organization until his death.

Work
For his work in partnership with Alfred Clas see Ferry & Clas
Wisconsin Woman's Club (1887) at 813 East Kilbourn Avenue
James McIntosh residence (1916) at 2704 E. Hartford Avenue

References

1851 births
1918 deaths
19th-century American architects
Architects from Milwaukee
Architects from Springfield, Massachusetts
Massachusetts Institute of Technology alumni
Fellows of the American Institute of Architects